Zbyněk Žába (June 19, 1917  – August 15, 1971) was a Czechoslovak Egyptologist.  In 1945 he commenced his studies on the subject and in 1949 he became an assistant to František Lexa.  In 1954 Žába  was named an associate professor of Egyptology, and in 1960 he was chosen to be the director of the Czechoslovak Institute of Egyptology, an institution founded in 1958 and originally led by Lexa.

Works

References

1917 births
1971 deaths
Czechoslovak people
Czechoslovak Egyptologists